Basic Instructions is an Ikara Colt EP released in September, 2002 by Fantastic Plastic Records in the UK and Epitaph Records in the US. The final track ("May B 1 Day #1") is the version of "May B 1 Day" featured on the band's debut album, Chat and Business.

Track listing

 Bring it to Me
 May B 1 Day #2
 Don't They Know
 Panic
 May B 1 Day #1
 May B 1 Day: Video (only available on the US Epitaph pressing)

Ikara Colt albums
2002 EPs